Valentin Dumitru Munteanu (born 24 October 1989) is a Romanian professional footballer who plays as a midfielder for Liga II side Gloria Buzău.

Honours
Fortuna Poiana Câmpina
Liga III: 2013–14
Dunărea Călărași
Liga II: 2017–18
FC U Craiova 1948
Liga II: 2020–21
CSM Reșița
Liga III: 2021–22

References

External links
 
 

1989 births
Living people
Romanian footballers
Association football midfielders
Liga I players
Liga II players
FCM Dunărea Galați players
CS Pandurii Târgu Jiu players
LPS HD Clinceni players
FCV Farul Constanța players
CS Concordia Chiajna players
FC Dunărea Călărași players
FC Gloria Buzău players
FC U Craiova 1948 players
CSM Reșița players
Sportspeople from Galați